St. Mary's College was a small rural secondary school in Clady, County Londonderry, Northern Ireland. In 2018, the school was amalgamated with St Paul's College Kilrea to form St Conor's College with a junior school at the Kilrea site.

External links
 Official Website

Educational institutions established in 1963
Catholic secondary schools in Northern Ireland
Defunct Catholic schools in Northern Ireland
Secondary schools in County Londonderry
1963 establishments in Northern Ireland